Dasycleobis is a monotypic genus of ammotrechid camel spiders, first described by Cândido Firmino de Mello-Leitão in 1940. Its single species, Dasycleobis crinitus is distributed in Argentina.

References 

Solifugae
Arachnid genera
Monotypic arachnid genera